Fair Lakes is a census-designated place (CDP) and business park located west of Fairfax in Fairfax County, Virginia, United States. Fair Lakes had a population of 7,942 in 2010.

Geography 
Fair Lakes is a mixed-use development of upscale residential apartments and commercial buildings, built by the Peterson Companies.

The main road in Fair Lakes is the Fair Lakes Parkway. Other major roads that pass through the area are the Fairfax County Parkway (SR 286); West Ox Road (SR 608), and SR 6751 / Monument Drive. SR 645 / Stringfellow Road forms the western boundary of Fair Lakes, and is also the western terminus for the Fair Lakes Parkway. An interchange with Interstate 66 is at the center of the Fair Lakes CDP. The southern border of the CDP follows U.S. Route 29 (Lee Highway).
 SR 7700 / Fair Lakes Parkway
 SR 286 / Fairfax County Parkway
 SR 608 / West Ox Road
 SR 645 / Stringfellow Road
 Interstate 66

Fair Lakes is bordered by Centreville to the west, Greenbriar to the north, and Fair Oaks to the east. Unincorporated land that is not part of any census-designated place is to the south across Route 29, including Cobbs Corner and Blevinstown.

History 
The area was farm land until planned development of the office parks and neighborhoods began in the 1980s and 1990s.

Major amenities

Malls and shopping centers 
East Market at Fair Lakes
Fair Lakes Center
Fair Lakes Promenade
Fair Oaks Mall
The Shops of Fair Lakes

Communities 
The Arbors at Fair Lakes
Avalon Fair Lakes
Camden Fair Lakes
Camden Monument Drive
Cedar Lakes
Elan Condominiums
Fair Lakes Condominiums
Fair Lakes Townhomes
Gates of Fair Lakes
The Greens at Fair Lakes Condominiums
North Lake
Willow Oaks at Fair Lakes
Water's Edge at Fair Lakes
The Windsor at Fair Lakes
Stonecroft Condominiums
Fair Lakes Pender Creek – Gables Residential

Private schools 
Chesterbrook Academy
Fair Lakes Children's Center

Companies 
Argon ST, Inc., a wholly owned subsidiary of Boeing
CGI Group
General Dynamics
Northrop Grumman
SRA International

References

External links 

Fair Lakes developer's website

Census-designated places in Fairfax County, Virginia
Washington metropolitan area
Business parks of the United States
Economy of Fairfax County, Virginia
Census-designated places in Virginia